Ostfriedhof may refer to:

 Ostfriedhof (Cologne), a cemetery in Cologne, Germany
 Ostfriedhof (Munich), a cemetery  in Munich, Germany